The 1969 Chattanooga Moccasins football team was an American football team that represented the University of Tennessee at Chattanooga during the 1969 NCAA College Division football season. In their second year under head coach Harold Wilkes, the team compiled a 4–6 record.

Schedule

References

Chattanooga
Chattanooga Mocs football seasons
Chattanooga Moccasins football